City National Plaza is a twin tower skyscraper complex on South Flower Street in western Downtown Los Angeles, California, United States. It was originally named ARCO Plaza upon opening in 1972.

History

Richfield Tower

The present complex is on the site of the landmark Richfield Tower, that was designed in the Art Deco style by Morgan, Walls & Clements, and completed in 1929. It was the headquarters of the Atlantic Richfield oil company. It was demolished in the spring of 1969.

ARCO Plaza
The current skyscraper complex was built as the ARCO Plaza, with a pair of  52-story office towers. One became the new world headquarters for the Atlantic Richfield Company (ARCO), the present day Paul Hastings Tower. An underground shopping complex was accessed by open escalators from the street level plaza.

Upon completion in 1972, the ARCO Plaza towers were the tallest buildings in the city for one year before being overtaken by Aon Center, and were the tallest twin towers in the world until the completion of the World Trade Center in New York City.

In 1986, joint owners ARCO and Bank of America sold the buildings to Shuwa Investments Corp., the American subsidiary of Shuwa Co. of Tokyo, for $650 million while both remained tenants in their respective named towers. Shuwa later sold the property in 2003 to Thomas Properties Group and other investors for $270 million.

The towers are constructed of steel frames covered with polished panels of forest green granite and panes of bronze glass.  In 2016, the exterior of the top two floors and the service roof of The Paul Hastings Tower were modified on the north, east, and south flanks to house their upgraded headquarters and offices.  This modification features silver trim and panes of light green glass panels.

City National Plaza
The ARCO Plaza complex was renamed City National Plaza in 2005, and the south and north towers, respectively, were renamed City National Tower and Paul Hastings Tower.  The low-rise building at the back of the plaza is known as the Jewel Box, and is occupied by the Gensler architectural firm. Gensler moved from Santa Monica to the Jewel Box in 2011.

The plaza includes a monumental sculpture-fountain, Double Ascension by artist Herbert Bayer.

Tenants

"Jewel Box"
 Gensler—architecture firm.

Paul Hastings Tower

 Boston Consulting Group
 Crowell & Moring
 RSM US
 Grant Thornton
 Northwestern Mutual - Los Angeles
 Paul Hastings
 Regus

City National Bank Tower
 City National Bank
 Foley & Lardner
 Norton Rose Fulbright
 Jones Day
Katten Muchin Rosenman
 Kroll
 Rottet Studio
 Squire Patton Boggs
 Turner Construction
 White & Case LLP

Shopping center
ARCO Plaza opened with a  shopping center on two levels which gained attention for the novelty of a shopping center within an office tower complex and for its sleek design of brick walkways, tiled and mirrored escalator wells and fresh flowers. There were over 40 shops and services and over 10 restaurants including “François”. During the 2004 renovation, the lower shopping level was converted to parking and today the one remaining level is a food court.

In popular culture
 Featured throughout the 1971 movie The Omega Man (which was filmed during the Plaza's construction phase) in various stages of completion.
 Plaza area and water sculpture featured in the 1976 film, Marathon Man.
 The complex was also extensively featured in the 1976 NBC mini-series, The Moneychangers, which starred Kirk Douglas, Christopher Plummer, Susan Flannery, Anne Baxter and Timothy Bottoms. The Bank of America branch then located in the jewel Box was rebadged as the First Mercantile American Bank (FMA) main branch for both exterior and interior filming. Multiple exterior shots of the ARCO tower (now the Paul Hastings Tower) were used to suggest it as the location of FMA's executive offices.
 The north "Paul Hastings" tower was depicted as being struck by an air-to-air Sidewinder missile (a shot which utilized a detailed miniature of both towers), in the 1983 film, Blue Thunder.
 In the 2015 film San Andreas, the twin towers were shown swaying violently during an earthquake and in a later shot, the Paul Hastings tower was shown falling on the City National Tower.
 Featured in "Adam-12 Skywatch part 1".  Reed and Malloy locate robbery suspects on the 26th floor while cross training with the helicopter unit.

Gallery

See also

Richfield Tower
List of tallest buildings in Los Angeles

References

Further reading

External links

Skyscraper office buildings in Los Angeles
Buildings and structures in Downtown Los Angeles
Office buildings completed in 1972
Oil company headquarters in the United States
ARCO
Twin towers
Bank company headquarters in the United States